Daniel Carvalho da Silva (born March 10, 1981), known as Daniel Gigante, is a Brazilian football player.

Career
Daniel Gigante has played professionally for Thespa Kusatsu in Japan.

Club statistics

References

External links

j-league
jsgoal

1981 births
Living people
Brazilian footballers
Brazilian expatriate footballers
J2 League players
Thespakusatsu Gunma players
Expatriate footballers in Japan
Association football defenders